The Crow is a Slavic fairy tale of Polish origin, translated by Hermann Kletke as Die Krähe, in his folktale compilation Märchensaal aller Völker. Andrew Lang included it in The Yellow Fairy Book.

Synopsis 
A king has three beautiful daughters, although the youngest of them is the most admired. While walking in a garden near the ruins of a castle, the youngest princess comes upon a crow that has been badly wounded. Noticing that the princess pities it, the crow reveals to her that he is a prince enchanted into taking the form of a crow for seven years. However, should the princess agree to live in the one remaining room of the castle and sleep on the golden bed each night without making a sound, she might free him. He warns her that if she does not obey this, his suffering will be doubled.

The princess agrees and moves into the ruined castle. Every night at midnight, wicked ghosts appear and threaten her until dawn, yet in spite of her terror she makes no sound. One of her visiting sisters attempts to sleep in the golden bed herself, yet is so terrified by the apparitions she screams; the youngest princess insists on being alone after this incident. The princess continues on with her silence, and notices that each day the grateful crow looks and claims to be doing better than before.

After two years of this, the crow informs her that, to complete her task, the princess must find work as a servant for one year. She succeeds, but is treated poorly by her new master. As the year comes to an end, the prince regains his human form and marries the princess. They return to live in the ruined castle, which has now been fully restored.

Translations
In the Polish original, The Enchanted Crow (Polish: Zaklęty w wronę), the youngest of three princesses likes to stroll in a beautiful garden located in a derelict castle. One day, she sees an injured crow on the ground. The bird tells her he is an enchanted prince and with her help he will be able to break his curse. Although popularized outside Poland via Kletke's transaltion, the fairy tale "The Crow" is virtually unknown in Poland itself (with the notable exception of academic scholars).

Analysis
Scholars Jan-Öjvind Swahn and Julian Krzyżanowski related the tale to the international type AaTh 425, "The Search for the Lost Husband", a cycle of stories related to Cupid and Psyche.

Folklorist D. L. Ashliman classified the tale in the Aarne-Thompson Index (pre-2004) as type AaTh 425N, "The Bird Husband", in his 1987 study of folktales. However, after 2004, German folklorist Hans-Jörg Uther updated the international catalogue and subsumed type AaTh 425N under the more general type ATU 425B, "The Son of the Witch".

Variants
Polish ethnographer Stanisław Ciszewski (pl) collected another variant with the name O zaklętym królewiczu ("About the enchanted prince"). In this tale, the prince character is cursed to be a crow (kruk, in the original text) for seven years, and the heroine is told to help him break the enchantment. On a footnote, Ciszewski cited the previous Polish tale Záklety we wrone.

See also
 The Story of Princess Zeineb and King Leopard (AaTh 425N)

Fairy tales about a prince transformed into a bird:
 The Bird Lover (ATU 432)
 The Blue Bird (fairy tale) (French fairy tale)
 The Green Knight (fairy tale) (Danish fairy tale)
 The Feather of Finist the Falcon (Russian fairy tale)
 The Canary Prince (Italian fairy tale)
 The Greenish Bird (Mexican fairy tale)
 The White Bird and His Wife

References 

European fairy tales
Polish fairy tales
Fictional birds
Characters in fairy tales
Fiction about shapeshifting
ATU 400-459